World Sailing (WS) is the world governing body for the sport of sailing recognized by the International Olympic Committee and the International Paralympic Committee (IPC).

History
The creation of the International Yacht Racing Union (IYRU) began in 1904, when Major Brooke Heckstall-Smith AINA, then Secretary of the Yacht Racing Association (now the Royal Yachting Association) wrote to the Yacht Club de France, pointing out the desirability of holding a conference for the purpose of devising an International Rule of Measurement for Racing Yachts acceptable to all European countries. As a result, an International Conference of Yacht Measurement was held in London in January and June 1906, at which the Metre Rule was developed. This group went on to adopt a formal Constitution after a meeting at the Yacht Club de France in Paris on 14 October 1907 which is seen as the formation date of the International Yacht Racing Union.

On 5 August 1996, the IYRU changed its name to the International Sailing Federation (ISAF).

On 14 November 2015, ISAF changed its name to World Sailing.

Competition formats
Competitive sailing regatta contain events which are defined by a combination of discipline, equipment, gender and sometimes categories. These criteria are defined by the race purpose.

Disciplines
The following are the main disciplines:
 Fleet Racing – The commonest form of competitive sailing involving boats racing around a course.
 Match Racing – Two identical boats race against each other. This is one-on-one duel requires strategy and tactics. The first to cross the finish line wins.
 Team Racing – Two teams each of normally three boats compete against each other. Fast-paced racing depends on excellent boat handling skills and rapid tactical decision making.
 Offshore/Oceanic – Any offshore race over 800 miles, including races around the world.
 Speed Sailing - Is managed by World Sailing Speed Record Council
 Wave riding is common to board sports
 Both windsurfing and kiteboarding are experimenting with new formats.
 Cruising – Can be a coastal day sail or a longer distance international journeys, it is the most commonly enjoyed sailing discipline.

Equipment
Common categories of equipment include the following: dinghies, multihulls, keelboats, sailing yacht, windsurfers, kiteboarding and radio-controlled sailboats. Within these categories normally specific class or rating system are used.

Gender
The majority of sailing events are "open" events in which males and females compete together on equal terms either as individuals or part of team. Sailing has had female only World Championships since the 1970s to encourage participation and now host more than 30 such World Championship titles each year. For the 2016 Olympics, compulsory mixed gender in the event was added for the first time.

Sailor categories
In addition the following categories are sometimes applied to events:
 Age
 Nationality
 Disabled Classification
 Sailor Classification

Rules and regulations
World Sailing is now most familiar to sailors for defining the Racing Rules of Sailing (RRS), the international standard used to define competition rules and the framework within which racing is conducted.

Para sailing regattas for para sailors likewise follow the World Sailing rulebook with a minor change to permit things like powered adaptations. Strict classification requirements are enforced in the Paralympic Games for fair competition in Paralympic-class keelboats.

The key documents under control of World Sailing are:
 Racing Rules of Sailing (RRS) – The RRS Rulebook is updated on every Olympic year.
 Equipment Rules of Sailing (ERS)
 Offshore Special Regulations (OSR)
 World Sailing Regulations and Constitution

Membership

National members

Like all sports federations, World Sailing is composed of "Member National Authorities" (MNA's) from over 140 countries all of whom have the right to make submissions to determine World Sailing's policies.

Persons with a physical impairment who are interested to learn to sail are encouraged to locate their national World Sailing Member National Authority (MNA), Disabled Sports Organization, or visit the local sailing club, as World Sailing seeks to integrate the differently abled into the sport.

Class associations

The federation recognizes over 80 classes which are each entitled to hold world championships.

Affiliated members
 Offshore Racing Congress (ORC)
 World Sailing Speed Record Council (WSSRC)
 International Radio Sailing Association (IRSA)

Events

Sailing and the Olympics

World Sailing is responsible for administration of the Olympic Sailing Regatta. Sailing (called yachting in the early years) has been a mainstay of the modern summer Olympic games since 1896, omitted only from the 1904 summer games in St. Louis.

To help encourage high level international competition in the Classes used for the Olympic Games, World Sailing arrange the following events:
 Sailing World Championships this is held every four years and is the combined World Championships for the Olympic classes and used as part of the Olympic Qualifying procedure
 Sailing World Cup, an annual global sailing tour

Sailing in the Paralympic Games

Sailing as an equipment based sports allows one of the largest ranges of paralympians to compete under equal terms. Sailing was included for the first time in the Atlanta 1996 Paralympic Games program as a demonstration event. It became a full medal sport at the Sydney 2000 Paralympic Games up to 2020 were IPC removed sailing from the paralympic program. Work continues to get sailing reinstated for the 2028 Paralympics.

World Sailing classes world championships

Each World Sailing class is entitled to hold a world championship

World Sailing initiated world championships and events 
The following World Championships are held:

 Sailing World Championships
 Sailing World Cup Series
 Youth Sailing World Championships
 Team Racing World Championship
 Offshore Team Racing World Championship
 Women's Match World Championship
 Open Match Racing World Championship (Presently awarded to the overall winner of the World Match Racing Tour)
 eSailing World Championship (2018 Onwards)
 Mixed Two Person Offshore Keelboat World Championship (2019 Onwards)
 Nations Cup match racing
 IYRU Women's World Championships (from 1978 to 1992)

World Sailing recognised world championships
 Offshore Racing Congress
 International Association for Disabled Sailing (IFDS)
 International Radio Sailing Association

World Sailing Special Events

 America's Cup
 SailGP
 Star Sailors League
 The Ocean Race
 World Match Racing Tour
 PWA World Windsurfing Tour
 GKA Kite World Tour
 Foiling Week

Disabled Sailing
Sailing is a versatile sport that can accommodate many types of disability primarily because it is equipment based. Sailing is one of the few sports where disabled sailors compete on equal terms to able body sailors in a large section of the sport. Almost any boat can be sailed though some are more suitable for larger ranges of disabilities or specific categories of impairment.
 
World Sailing is also responsible for disabled sailing worldwide under the guidance of its own brand Para World Sailing. This is since the merger of International Association for Disabled Sailing (IFDS) in November 2014, and re-forming of the World Sailing Committee later rebrand Para World Sailing. The rational was given as follows: "The creation of a single governing body for Member National Authorities (MNAs) and sailors will better serve the needs and interests of sailors with disabilities, and provide consistency within the sport, from relationships with the World Anti-Doping Agency (WADA) to technical support and operational efficiencies."

The IFDS Foundation was dissolved during the 2015 Annual Conference in Sanya, China. The Disabled Sailing Committee then re-branded as the Para World Sailing Committee.

People

Presidents
From 1906 to 1946 a chairman was elected from time to time to orchestrate the annual meetings.
 1946–1955: Sir Ralph Gore was elected the first President
 1955–1969: Sir Peter Scott
 1969–1986: 
 1986–1994: 
 1994–2004: 
 2004–2012: 
 2012–2016: 
 2016–2020: 
 2020–Present:

Vice presidents
Vice presidents have been elected since 1955.
 1998–2008: 
 2004–2012: , Teresa Lara, 
 2008–2012: , Eric Tulla, Tomasz Holc
 2008–2016: 

Presidents of Honour
 1958–1991: King Olav V of Norway
 1994–2023: King Constantine II of Greece
 1994–present: King Harald V of Norway

Race officials
There are four types of race officials used to conduct sailing events recognised by World Sailing as follows:
 International Judge
 International Measurer
 International Race Officer
 International Umpire

Official awards
World Sailing hold the following awards together with service medals.

Rolex World Sailor of the Year

The main annual award the "Rolex World Sailor of the Year" that is sponsored by ROLEX in the following categories:
 Male World Sailor of the Year
 Female World Sailor of the Year

When a crew of 1, 2 or 3 people is nominated, the awarded is presented to the entire crew. When larger crews win the award, normally only the skipper is recognised.

Hall of Fame

On 5 November 2007 in Estoril, Portugal, the International Sailing Federation announced the first six inductees for the ISAF Sailing Hall of Fame.
 Olin Stephens (USA)
 Dame Ellen MacArthur (GBR)
 Paul Elvstrøm (DEN)
 Barbara Kendall (NZL)
 Eric Tabarly (FRA)
 Sir Robin Knox-Johnston (GBR)

At the 2015 Annual Conference in Sanya, China, there were seven further inductees.
 Dennis Conner (USA)
 Alessandra Sensini (ITA)
 Harold Vanderbilt (USA)
 Sir Peter Blake (NZL)
 Buddy Melges (USA)
 Valentin Mankin (UKR)
 Torben Grael (BRA)

Beppe Croce Trophy
The Beppe Croce Trophy is presented to an individual who has made an outstanding voluntary contribution to the sport of sailing. The roll of honour is an impressive one, including multiple Olympic medallists, rules gurus and designers, and all have dedicated an outstanding amount of time to the sport of sailing. Recipients are presented with a replica trophy.

See also
 :Category:Classes of World Sailing
 International Regulations for Preventing Collisions at Sea (COLREGS)

Notes

References

External links

 

 
Sports organizations established in 1907
1907 establishments in France
Sailing
Organisations based in London
Sailing in the United Kingdom
Sailing rules and handicapping
Sport in London